Grant Palmer (born August 30, 2002) is an American actor. He is best known for voicing Lincoln Loud in the Nickelodeon series, The Loud House. After episode 22, he was supplanted by Collin Dean due to puberty, and has since had a recurring role as the character Grant from episode 52 onwards.

He also voices one of the Hatchlings in The Angry Birds Movie. On camera, Palmer plays Waldo in The Little Rascals Save the Day, Leland in Comedy Bang! Bang!, and Nate in the Nickelodeon series Game Shakers.

Filmography

References

External links

2002 births
Living people
American male child actors
American male voice actors
People from California